Mike McDonnell (born January 15, 1966) is an American politician who serves in the Nebraska Legislature, representing the 5th district. He is a registered Democrat

Early life and education 
McDonnell was born in Omaha, Nebraska. He graduated from Daniel J. Gross Catholic High School in 1984. He earned a bachelor's degree in criminal justice from the University of Nebraska Omaha in 1992, an associate's degree in fire protection technology in 1996, and a master's degree from Bellevue University in 2014.

Career 
McDonnell was a former chief of Omaha Professional Firefighters IAFF Local 385 for the City of Omaha under Mayor Al Veys. On November 8, 2013, Mike retired as Fire Chief from the Omaha Fire Department after 24 years of service to the citizens of Omaha. He also served with union group like Omaha Federation of Labor, AFL-CIO.

Nebraska Legislature 
In 2016 he ran for the Legislature against Republican Gilbert Ayala. Ayala, a Republican, finished second in the nonpartisan primary, which saw McDonnell and Gilbert Ayala advance to the general election. McDonnell defeated Ayala in the general election with nearly 70% of the vote and In 2020 reelection he defeated Ayala with 63.2% of the vote.

Abortion 
McDonnell, in an interview Thursday at the Capitol, said he was upfront when he ran for the Legislature in 2016 about being anti-abortion and about his Catholic faith. He said he has been a Democrat since 1984. He also said his support of the “heartbeat bill” would remain the same whether he was the bill’s 15th vote, 49th vote or 33rd vote. He backed legislation last year that would have banned abortion outright, That legislation failed to pass. In responses, he is being denied a voting role in the Douglas County Democratic Party as members believe some of his beliefs don’t align with the party’s values.

Possible run for 2025 Omaha mayoral bid 
Political insiders tell us McDonnell is strongly considering a Mayoral run in 2025, though he wouldn’t confirm that with 6 News Thursday.

He says to WOWT “If I decide to run for Mayor or not decide to run for Mayor, I’m not going to base my votes in the Unicameral on possibly running for Mayor or any office in the future”.

Personal life 
McDonnell is married to his wife Amy. He is Roman Catholic and resides in South Omaha, Nebraska. He has one children.

Electoral history

2016

2020

References

External links
 Mike McDonnell for Legislature campaign website
 Sen. Mike McDonnell official legislative website

1966 births
Living people
Catholics from Nebraska
Democratic Party Nebraska state senators
21st-century American politicians